Basket Lake is a natural freshwater lake in Highlands County, Florida. This lake is shaped like a peanut and is surrounded by citrus groves, which in turn are surrounded by Basket Lake Road.

There is no public access to Basket Lake, as it is completely surrounded by private land.  Therefore, no boating, swimming or fishing can be done without permission.  Two websites, however, have comments saying the fishing is good for various types of fish, including bass, shellcracker, crappie and perch.

References

Lakes of Highlands County, Florida
Lakes of Florida